The IBM M44/44X was an experimental computer system from the mid-1960s, designed and operated at IBM's Thomas J. Watson Research Center at Yorktown Heights, New York. It was based on a modified IBM 7044 (the 'M44'), and simulated multiple 7044 virtual machines (the '44X'), using both hardware and software. Key team members were Dave Sayre and Rob Nelson. This was a groundbreaking machine, used to explore paging, the virtual machine concept, and computer performance measurement. It was purely a research system, and was cited in 1981 by Peter Denning as an outstanding example of experimental computer science.

The term virtual machine probably originated with the M44/44X project, from which it was later appropriated by the CP-40 team to replace their earlier term pseudo machine.

Unlike CP-40 and later CP/CMS control programs, M44/44X did not implement a complete simulation of the underlying hardware (i.e. full virtualization). CP-40 project leader Robert Creasy observed:

The M44/44X "was about as much of a virtual machine system as CTSS – which is to say that it was close enough to a virtual machine system to show that 'close enough' did not count. I never heard a more eloquent argument for virtual machines than from Dave Sayre."

M44/44X "implanted the idea that the virtual machine concept is not necessarily less efficient than more conventional approaches" – a core assumption in the CP/CMS architecture, and one that ultimately proved very successful.

References
 R. J. Creasy, "The origin of the VM/370 time-sharing system", IBM Journal of Research & Development, Vol. 25, No. 5 (September 1981), pp. 483-490,– perspective on CP/CMS and VM history by the CP-40 project lead, also a CTSS author
 Peter J. Denning, "Performance Modeling: Experimental Computer Science at its Best", Communications of the ACM, President's Letter (November 1981) – an influential survey paper, citing the following M44/44X papers:

 L. Belady, "A study of replacement algorithms for virtual storage computers," IBM Systems Journal Vol. 5, No. 2 (1966), pp. 78-101

 L. Belady and C. J. Kuehner, "Dynamic space sharing in computer systems," Communications of ACM Vol. 12 No. 5 (May 1969), pp. 282-288

 L. Belady, R. A. Nelson, and G. S. Shedler, "An anomaly in the space-time characteristics of certain programs running in paging machines," Communications of the ACM Vol. 12, No. 6 (June 1969), pp. 349-353

 – describes the M44/44X, reports performance measurements related to memory and paging, and discusses performance impact of multiprogramming and time-sharing
 R. A. Nelson, "Mapping Devices and the M44 Data Processing System," Research Report RC 1303, IBM Thomas J. Watson Research Center (1964)– about the M44/44X
 D. Sayre, On Virtual Systems, IBM Thomas J. Watson Research Center (April 15, 1966)– an early virtual machine paper describing multiprogramming with the M44/44X.
 Melinda Varian, VM and the VM community, past present, and future, SHARE 89 Sessions 9059-9061, 1997– the outstanding source for CP/CMS and VM history

Citations

M44 44X
Virtualization software
VM (operating system)